The 2003 Miami Dolphins season was the franchise's 34th season in the National Football League, the 38th overall and third under head coach Dave Wannstedt. The Dolphins improved upon their previous season's output of 9–7 by winning 10 games. This marked the seventh consecutive winning season for the team and fifteenth straight with a record of .500 or better, but for the second straight year they failed to clinch a playoff berth.

Offseason

NFL Draft

Staff

Roster

Schedule

Preseason

Regular season

Game summaries

Week 1 vs. Houston Texans 
The Dolphins season got off to a rough start in their first ever meeting with the second-year Houston Texans. The Dolphins behind three Jay Fiedler touchdowns led 20-15 in the fourth, but two field goals (the first off a Fiedler interception) put the Texans up 21-20 with thirty seconds to go. Fielder was then intercepted again, ending the game in a 21-20 Miami loss, the Dolphins' first loss to a Houston NFL team since losing to the Oilers in 1991.

Week 2 at New York Jets 

    
    
    
    
    

Ricky Williams erupted to 125 rushing yards and a touchdown as Fiedler and Travis Minor added 62 more yards on the ground in Miami's first win of the season. The Dolphins held Curtis Martin to 32 yards total.

Week 3 vs. Buffalo Bills 
After being swept the year before the Dolphins embarrassed the Bills, limiting them to 139 yards of offense and intercepting Drew Bledsoe three times. Ricky Williams exploded to 154 rushing yards and a touchdown in the 17-7 Miami win.

Week 5 at New York Giants 
The Dolphins continued surging 23-10 despite being outgained 350 yards to 275. Miami intercepted Kerry Collins three times and rushed for 134 yards - 68 of them on James McKnight's 68-yard rushing touchdown. Ricky Williams scored a touchdown on 1 yard run to ice the game. The Dolphins beat the Giants for the first time since their perfect season.

Week 6 at Jacksonville Jaguars 
The Dolphins returned to Jacksonville for the first time since the 2000 AFC divisional playoffs being blown out 62-7 to put up just 234 total yards, were penalized for 149 total yards, yet picked off Byron Leftwich three times and snatched two Jaguars fumbles en route to winning 24-10. Randy McMichael scored when he scooped up a fumble by teammate Obafemi Ayanbadejo from the Jaguars 2-yard line.

Week 7 vs. New England Patriots 
The Dolphins and Patriots were battling for first in the AFC East and the Dolphins forced two fumbles - one by Tom Brady on a quarterback sneak - and led 13-6 before Brady whipped a 24-yard touchdown to a leaping David Givens. The Dolphins drove to the New England 17 before the two-minute warning; when Ricky Williams appeared to be downed short of a first down the Patriots challenged the spot but the call stood. Olindo Mare's 35-yard kick following the two-minute warning was blocked, but the Dolphins smothered the Patriots final drive (the key play came when former Patriot Terrell Buckley blew up a Kevin Faulk run for a four-yard loss). The game went to overtime and controversy ensued on the coin toss as the Patriots called tails but referee Gerald Austin, using a silver dollar that came up Lady Columbia (heads on a silver dollar) called it heads. On the Dolphins ensuing drive Fiedler completed a 31-yard bomb to the left sideline to Derrius Thompson; four Ricky Williams runs for 26 yards put the ball back on the 17, the dirt portion of the field with Pro Player Stadium hosting the 2003 World Series involving the Florida Marlins. Mare's kick missed, but the Patriots had to punt; on the next Miami drive Fiedler escaped a sack and heaved a bomb that was intercepted by Tyrone Poole at the New England 18. From there Brady finished off the game on an 82-yard touchdown to Troy Brown.

Week 8 at San Diego Chargers 
Wildfires in California forced the Chargers to move their Monday Night game with Miami to the Cardinals' home stadium. With Brian Griese replacing Jay Fiedler at quarterback the Dolphins jumped on the struggling Chargers, scoring 24 points in the first half while sacking Drew Brees six times (once for a safety in the fourth quarter) and intercepting him three times. The Dolphins won 26-10 as the two teams combined for just 514 yards of offense.

Week 9 vs. Indianapolis Colts 
Former AFC East rival Indianapolis made its first trip to Miami since 2001. Following a Ricky Williams touchdown the Colts scored 16 points. An exchange of touchdown throws and a Marvin Harrison fumble were followed by a late Olindo Mare field goal with the score 23-17 Colts. Terrell Buckley of the Dolphins picked off Peyton Manning with 2:50 to go, but at 2:17 Griese was strip-sacked by Dwight Freeney and the game ended in the 23-17 Indianapolis win.

Week 10 at Tennessee Titans 
The Titans annihilated the Dolphins 31-7 (the Titans franchise's first win over the Dolphins since their 1991 season as the Houston Oilers) by scoring the first 31 points. Steve McNair threw for 201 yards and two touchdowns while Griese was intercepted three times. McNair and three Titans backs rushed for 101 yards while McNair and Billy Volek's combined passing yards (223) almost outdid Miami's entire yardage on offense (224).

Week 11 vs. Baltimore Ravens 
The two teams combined for 490 yards of offense as Anthony Wright made his debut with the Ravens. Wright was intercepted twice as the game saw just four combined field goals and went into overtime tied 6-6. In overtime Wright fumbled to Zach Thomas and from there the Dolphins drove down for the winning Mare field goal, 9-6 final.

Week 12 vs. Washington Redskins 
Despite an 80-yard touchdown from Brian Griese to James McKnight, the Dolphins fell behind 20-7 late in the second quarter. Following a third-quarter interception Griese was benched for Jay Fiedler with the Dolphins down 23-10, and Fiedler led two touchdown drives ending in Ricky Williams touchdowns. Brock Marion intercepted Tim Hasselbeck but the Dolphins had to punt; the Redskins botched the catch and James McKnight recovered the fumble, securing the 24-23 Dolphins win.

Thanksgiving Day at Dallas Cowboys 
For the third time in ten years the Cowboys, surging under first-year coach Bill Parcells, hosted the Dolphins on Thanksgiving, ten years after the infamous Leon Lett game and four years after a shutout win over Miami 20-0. The Dolphins this time made sure of the outcome; they sacked Quincy Carter five times and intercepted him three times, leading 37-14 halfway through the third quarter and winning 40-21.

Week 14 at New England Patriots 
All hope for the division title was buried amid a heavy snowstorm at Gillette Stadium. Neither offense could move particularly well with an Adam Vinatieri field goal the only points until halfway through the fourth quarter. Backed up to his own goalline, Jay Fiedler was intercepted by Tedy Bruschi and Bruschi walked on his knees into the endzone; the touchdown caused fans to start throwing snow into the air in celebration. After a Ty Law interception and subsequent Patriots punt Fiedler was sacked in the endzone for a safety with 1:18 to go, ending a 12-0 Patriots win.

Monday Night Football vs. Philadelphia Eagles 
The Dolphins returned to the warmth of Pro Player Stadium and wound up in a heated game against the surging Eagles. The two teams combined for 799 yards of offense, 317 of them on the ground with six touchdowns. The game lead tied or changed four times in the first half as Donovan McNabb ran in a touchdown and Freddie Mitchell unleashed a 25-yard score to Brian Westbrook. Jay Fiedler was picked off twice and also failed on a fourth-down attempt in the second quarter of the 34-27 Dolphins loss.

Week 16 at Buffalo Bills 
With all playoff hopes gone, the Dolphins traveled to Ralph Wilson Stadium and defeated the Bills 20-3 in a game where the two teams combined for just over 400 yards of offense. Drew Bledsoe was benched after a 74-yard pick-six to Terrell Buckley and being sacked six times. Jay Fiedler threw only seventeen passes with only eight completions for 46 yards.

Week 17 vs. New York Jets 
The season wrapped up against the 6-9 New York Jets and the resulting game turned into a tight contest. Jay Fiedler threw for 328 yards but the Jets rallied from down 20-7 by scoring fifteen points (six of them Doug Brien field goals while Dolphins punter and ex-Jet Matt Turk fumbled in the end zone for a safety and a two-point try after an Anthony Becht touchdown failed) that went unanswered until Fiedler completed three passes for 36 yards and Olindo Mare's 22-yard field goal with three seconds to go was good, ending a 23-21 Dolphins win.

Standings

References 

Miami Dolphins seasons
Miami Dolphins
Miami Dolphins